The Black Manufacturing Company was a clothing manufacturer that produced the Black Bear brand of overalls as well as mackinaws and overcoats; George G. Black was the proprietor.  In 1914, Black had a building designed by Andrew Willatzen built for the company in Seattle. The business continued until 1982. The company's building is an official Seattle landmark and has been used by Dairygold.

Isham F. Norris worked at the company.

Signage for the company featured the slogan "Black Bear Means Long Wear". A 1941 catalog survives.

The Black Bear brand has been relaunched by Josh Sirlin.

References

Companies with year of establishment missing
American companies disestablished in 1982
Defunct companies based in Seattle
Clothing manufacturers
Defunct manufacturing companies based in Washington (state)
Clothing companies disestablished in 1982
Clothing companies of the United States